Whiteside may refer to:

Places
Australia
 Whiteside, Queensland, suburb in the Moreton Bay Region, Queensland
Canada
 Whiteside, Nova Scotia
United Kingdom
 Whiteside (Lake District), a fell in the west of the English Lake District
 Whiteside, a historic farm in Carrycoats estate in Northumberland
 Whiteside in Thirlwall, Northumberland
 Whiteside in Whalton, Northumberland
 Whiteside, West Lothian, a village on the edge of Bathgate, Scotland
United States
 Whiteside County, Illinois, county in Illinois
 Whiteside, Missouri, village in Lincoln County, Missouri
 Whiteside, Tennessee, unincorporated place in Marion County, Tennessee
 Whiteside Mountain, Jackson County, North Carolina

Other uses
 Whiteside (surname)

See also
White Side, a fell in the east of the English Lake District
Whitesides